Bayasgalangiin Solongo (born 6 February 1990) is a Mongolian basketball player. She competed in the 2020 Summer Olympics.

References

External links
 
 
 
 

1990 births
Living people
Sportspeople from Ulaanbaatar
3x3 basketball players at the 2020 Summer Olympics
Olympic 3x3 basketball players of Mongolia
Mongolian women's 3x3 basketball players
Basketball players at the 2014 Asian Games
Basketball players at the 2018 Asian Games
21st-century Mongolian women